The 1897–98 Scottish Districts season is a record of all the rugby union matches for Scotland's district teams.

History

Glasgow District beat Edinburgh District in the Inter-City match.

South of Scotland District beat North of Scotland District by 8 goals and 2 tries to nil.

An Anglo-Scots versus South of Scotland District match was supposed to be played on 25 December 1897. The teams were announced but the match was called off.

Results

Inter-City

Glasgow District:

Edinburgh District:

Other Scottish matches

North of Scotland:

South of Scotland:

English matches

No other District matches played.

International matches

No touring matches this season.

References

1897–98 in Scottish rugby union
Scottish Districts seasons